Matthias Jarke (born 1952 in Hamburg) is a German computer scientist.

Life and work
After double master's degrees in computer science and business administration at the University of Hamburg, Germany, he received his doctorate in operations research there in 1980. In 1981 he joined the Stern School of Management at New York University as an Assistant Professor, where he received an early promotion to Associate Professor in 1983, and early tenure in 1985. In 1986 he returned to Germany as a full professor of dialog-oriented systems at the University of Passau, from where he moved to RWTH Aachen University as Professor of Information Systems in 1991. From 1992-2000, he served as chairman of Aachen's Computer Science department.

Since January 2000, he additionally became executive director of the Fraunhofer Institute for Applied Information Technology FIT in Sankt Augustin near Bonn, Germany. In 2010, he was also appointed Chairman of the Fraunhofer ICT Group, and member of the Fraunhofer Presidential Board. With a budget of over €220 mio. and over 3.300 employees, Fraunhofer ICT Group is one of the largest applied research organizations in information and communication technology in Europe.

Since 2002, Jarke has been founding director of the B-IT foundation which fosters the internationalization of German CS education through its Bonn-Aachen International Center for Information Technology (B-IT). In 2008, its international master programs in media informatics, life science informatics, and autonomous systems were augmented by a dedicated B-IT Research School of doctoral training, co-funded by the state of North Rhine-Westphalia.

In his research Jarke, investigates metadata management and data quality, requirements engineering, and information systems engineering with a focus on mobile and cooperative systems. He served as a member of the coordination team of the "RWTH-2020 Future Initiative" at RWTH Aachen University, an excellence program of the German federal government, and as deputy coordinator of the DFG-funded Excellence Cluster on Ultra High-speed Mobile Information and Communication UMIC.

Jarke has authored or edited over twenty books and more than 300 refereed publications, was chief editor of the Elsevier journal "Information Systems for ten years, and program chair of almost all leading international conferences in the database and information systems field. He is a fellow of the German Informatics society GI and was in 2012 elected to the acatech German National Academy of Engineering and Sciences. From 2000-2003 he served as treasurer of GI and was then elected as GI president for two consecutive terms 2004-2007. In this time, he also served as scientific coordinator of the "Year of Computer Science 2006" in which the German federal government chose computer science for the first and so far only topic of its annual Science Years.

References 

 http://dbis.rwth-aachen.de/cms/staff/jarke
 http://www.jucs.org/jucs_articles_by_author/Jarke_Matthias/BusinessCard
 https://web.archive.org/web/20140908190311/http://tmis.acm.org/bios/jarke.html
 http://www.fit.fraunhofer.de/en/profil/institutsleitung.html
 http://dbis.rwth-aachen.de/cms/news/chairnews.2012-09-28.2616321182?set_language=de&cl=de
 http://www.alphagalileo.org/ViewItem.aspx?ItemId=124131&CultureCode=en
 http://www.fit.fraunhofer.de/en/presse/12-09-18.html
 http://www.umic.rwth-aachen.de/mainmenu/organisation/steering-committee/
 https://web.archive.org/web/20070612061817/http://www.iuk.fraunhofer.de/index2.html?Sp=2&Dok_ID=9
 https://web.archive.org/web/20120402060608/http://www.bit.uni-bonn.de/Wob/en/view/class211_id552.html

1952 births
Living people
Scientists from Hamburg
German computer scientists
University of Hamburg alumni
New York University faculty
Academic staff of the University of Passau
Presidents of the German Informatics Society
Academic staff of RWTH Aachen University